Togolese people in France consist of migrants from Togo and their descendants living and working in France. They are one of the Sub-Saharan African diasporas in France.

History                             
The first Togolese immigrants in France arrived in the 1970s and the 1980s. They come mostly to live in poor suburban areas (banlieue).

Notable people

See also
 France–Togo relations
 Togolese people in Italy
 Togolese Canadians
 Togolese Americans
 Togolese people in the United Kingdom
 Togolese people in Belgium
 Togolese people in the Netherlands
 Togolese people in Germany
 Togolese people in Switzerland
 Togolese Australians

References                            

Society of France
 
African diaspora in France
Immigration to France by country of origin